Rolf Krake was a Danish turret ironclad built in Scotland during the 1860s. The vessel was designed by Cowper Phipps Coles, a pioneering naval architect, and was the first warship of any navy to carry a turret of the type designed by Coles. She was the first all-iron, steam-powered vessel acquired by Denmark.

Design and description
Rolf Krake was ordered in 1862 as tensions rose between Prussia and Denmark over the Duchy of Schleswig-Holstein in the early 1860s. She displaced  and her crew consisted of 140 officers and ratings. Hinged bulwarks were fitted to improve Rolf Krakes seakeeping abilities. She was equipped with a beak-shaped ram at the bow.

The ship had one direct-acting steam engine that drove a single  propeller, using steam provided by two boilers. She was schooner-rigged with three masts.

Rolf Krake was initially armed with four Swedish-built 68-pounder smoothbore guns, one pair in each gun turret. The hand-operated turrets took a crew of 18 men one minute to complete a full revolution.

The armour protection of the turrets was quite elaborate. The 4.5-inch iron plates were bolted to the outside using bolts that ran through to the interior iron "skin". The area around the gun ports was reinforced by  plates to give a total thickness of 8 inches.

Construction and career
The Danes signed the contract with Robert Napier and Sons for Rolf Krake named after Rolf Krake, a hero of Danish saga, on 28 August 1862. 
She was laid down in Govan later that year, launched on 6 May 1863, and commissioned upon her arrival in Denmark in July. Following her commissioning, Rolf Krake engaged in sea trials from 18 July to 20 August 1863.

She saw service in the Second War of Schleswig.

Notes

References

External links
 
 ROLF KRAKE (1863–1907)

Ironclad warships of the Royal Danish Navy
1863 ships
Ships built in Govan